Triple E Recreational Vehicles, a division of Triple E Canada, is a Canadian recreational vehicle manufacturing company located in Winkler, Manitoba established in 1965. Triple E RV manufactures class B and C motorhomes.  Leisure Travel Vans is a brand of Triple E Recreational Vehicles.

Manufacturing companies of Canada
Winkler, Manitoba
Companies based in Manitoba
Recreational vehicle manufacturers

Manufacturing companies based in Manitoba